Tiler Kalyn Peck (born January 12, 1989) is an American ballet dancer who is a principal dancer with the New York City Ballet. As well as ballet, she has performed in musical theatre shows and has made cameo appearances in films including Donnie Darko and television series including Tiny Pretty Things.

Early life 
Born in Bakersfield, California, Peck started her studies at her mother's ballet studio in Bakersfield, at the age of two. She started her formal training in classical ballet at the age of seven when she received private lessons in Hollywood from Alla Khaniashvili, a former dancer with the Bolshoi Ballet. Later, she began to study with New York City Ballet dancers Colleen and Patricia Neary in California. During this time she enrolled at the Westside School of Ballet in Santa Monica where she studied with the former New York City Ballet principal Yvonne Mousey and learned the Balanchine technique.

Ballet career 
While performing on Broadway in Susan Stroman's revival of the Meredith Wilson musical The Music Man, Peck entered the School of American Ballet for the winter term of 2000–2001. The following year she enrolled as a full-time student starting with the summer session of 2002. In September 2004, she joined New York City Ballet as an apprentice. She was promoted to the corps de ballet in February 2005, to soloist in December 2006, and to principal dancer in October 2009.

Peck danced at the Kennedy Honors ceremony twice, in 2012 and 2014, performing in front of President Barack Obama and First Lady Michelle Obama. In 2014, she started "Tiler Peck Designs", her own dance wear collection carried by Body Wrappers. That same year, she performed at the Laguna Dance Festival, with her colleague Joaquín De Luz. In October of the same year, Peck reunited with Susan Stroman in Washington DC to work with her on her new musical, Little Dancer.

Peck's repertoire at NYCB includes choreography by George Balanchine, Jerome Robbins, Susan Stroman, Christopher Wheeldon, Peter Martins and Justin Peck. She has performed leading roles in Jewels, The Nutcracker, Raymonda Variations, La Sylphide, Romeo and Juliet, Coppélia, The Sleeping Beauty, and Swan Lake.

Other appearances 
Peck has explored other activities besides ballet, such as musical theater and acting. In 2019, she returned to her role in the musical Little Dancer which had been reworked and re-titled to Marie, Dancing Still. She has also performed as Clara in the Radio City Christmas Spectacular.

She has had small parts in movies. Her appearances include A Time for Dancing (2000), Geppetto (2000), Donnie Darko (2001), Catfish (2010), Enemy Within (2014) and the documentary about choreographer Justin Peck's choreographic process, Ballet 422 (2014). She has appeared on TV performing as a guest on Dancing with the Stars. In 2011 she performed as Dewdrop in Live from Lincoln Center’s transmission of "The Nutcracker". In 2013, she appeared again at Lincoln Center as Louise Bigelow in the PBS telecast of Rodgers & Hammerstein´s Carousel.

In 2017 Peck appeared on "The Ellen DeGeneres Show" as the first ballerina to ever perform on the show.

Peck was the main focus of the 2018 documentary movie Ballet Now which was shown at the 2018 Seattle International Film Festival.

In 2020 Peck appeared in the Netflix series Tiny Pretty Things as Sienna Milken.

Personal life 
Tiler Peck married New York City principal ballet dancer Robert Fairchild, on June 22, 2014, in New York. The couple separated in 2017. For the duration of her marriage, Peck was sister-in-law to Megan Fairchild, Robert's sister.

References

External links 

1989 births
Living people
21st-century American ballet dancers
American ballerinas
Dancers from California
Janice Levin Award dancers
New York City Ballet principal dancers
Mae L. Wien Award recipients
Princess Grace Awards winners
School of American Ballet alumni
21st-century American women